Shudder -Kanzen Ban-(Shudder -完全盤-) is a reissue of 12012's maxi single Shudder, released on June 15, 2005 along with "Depression Sign -Kanzen Ban-" and "Increasingly -Kanzen Ban-". The songs have been remastered and a bonus track is also included.

Track listing 
Disc One
 "Shudder" - 4:54
 "In Favor of...?" - 0:40
 "Venom" - 3:58
Disc Two
 "Call Me" - 5:15

Notes
On the cover, the name of the single is stylised as "Shudder[ƒλdƏr]".
Only 5000 copies of the maxi single were pressed.
The song "Call Me" would later be re-recorded and released on the Icy -Cold City- single, as "Call Me -Another Edition-".

2005 singles
12012 songs
Reissue albums
2005 songs